MS C.T.M.A. Vacancier is a car/passenger ferry operated by Coopérative de Transport Maritime et Aérien (CTMA) on their Montreal–Cap-aux-Meules service. She was built in 1973 by the J.J. Sietas Schiffswerft in Hamburg, West Germany as Aurella for SF Line for use on Viking Line traffic. Between 1982 and 1998 she sailed as Saint Patrick II, between 1998 and 2000 as Egnatia II, in 2000 as Ville de Séte and between 2001 and 2002 as City of Cork, before being sold to her current owners.

History

Aurella was ordered by SF Line, Finland on 27 May 1972, and delivered on 30 June 1973, entering service three days later on Viking Line's Naantali–Mariehamn–Kapellskär route. She was the largest ship in the services across the Sea of Åland at the time, Aurella remained in service with Viking Line until September 1981.

In January 1982, having been laid up Mariehamn through the winter, Aurella was sold to Irish Ferries and renamed Saint Patrick II, to provide extra capacity on the Ireland-France route in the summer months. The lack of traffic during the winter months saw her chartered to other operators:
 1982–1983 to North Sea Ferries and Belfast Car Ferries;
 1984–1985 to B&I Line;
 1985–1986 to DFDS Seaways and Stena Line;
 1987–1989 again to B&I Line;
 1989–1990 to Sealink;
 1990–1991 to P&O European Ferries. 
From 1992 until 1995 Saint Patrick II spent the winters sailing for Tallink. During the Tallink charters the ship was also re-registered to Estonia, but returned to the Irish registry during the summer service with her owners.  On 4 March 1994, while under charter to Tallink, Saint Patrick II participated in the evacuation of the sinking cruise ship  near Porkkala, Finland. Falling passenger numbers caused Irish Ferries to withdraw Saint Patrick II from service in September 1997.

In May 1998, Saint Patrick II was chartered to Hellenic Mediterranean Lines, renamed Egnatia II and placed on Brindisi–Patras service. In May 2000 she was chartered to Balear Express, Spain and renamed Ville de Séte for Sète–Palma service. Balear Express went bankrupt in September 2000, and Ville de Séte was laid up. Between March and December 2001 she was chartered to Swansea Cork Ferries as City of Cork.

In March 2002, City of Cork was sold to the Government of Canada and registered to Navigation Madeleine Inc, a subsidiary of Coopérative de Transport Maritime et Aérien (CTMA). In June she was renamed C.T.M.A. Vacancier and placed on CTMA's service between Montreal and Cap-aux-Meules. In 2003 she was rebuilt at Les Mechins Dry Dock, Quebec with covered bridge wings.

In January 2020, C.T.M.A. Vacancier was hired by the Société des traversiers du Québec to cover the Matane-Baie-Comeau-Godbout route across the Saint Lawrence River, while the engines of MV F.-A.-Gauthier engines were repaired and the MV Saaremaa I was altered to meet Transport Canada standards.

References

External links
 CTMA official website
 Past vessels list on Viking Line official website

Ferries of Quebec
Ships built in Hamburg
1973 ships
Transport in Gaspésie–Îles-de-la-Madeleine
Transport in Montreal